Gaston Alfred Green III (born August 1, 1966) is an American former professional football player who was a running back in the National Football League (NFL) for the Los Angeles Rams, Denver Broncos and Los Angeles Raiders. He played college football for the UCLA Bruins,

Biography
Green was born in Los Angeles, California. He played prep football at Gardena High School in Los Angeles, and played college football at the University of California, Los Angeles.

He was selected by the Los Angeles Rams in the 1st round (14th overall) of the 1988 NFL Draft. He was a 5'10", 189-lb. running back from UCLA. Green played in the NFL for five seasons, from 1988 through 1992. He was a Pro Bowl selection in 1991 as a Bronco, rushing for 1,037 yards.

Green returned to UCLA in 2011 to complete his college degree. Green's 3,731-yard career record at UCLA was surpassed on November 3, 2012 by tailback Johnathan Franklin.

Green and his family live outside of Atlanta, GA.

NFL career statistics

References

External links
 Pro-Football-Reference.Com
 database Football.com
 NFL Enterprises LLC
 Los Angeles Times: Rams' Gaston Green Is Still Waiting To Deliver on That UCLA Promise

1966 births
Living people
American football running backs
Denver Broncos players
Los Angeles Raiders players
Los Angeles Rams players
UCLA Bruins football players
American Conference Pro Bowl players
Gardena High School alumni
Players of American football from Los Angeles